This is a list of notable alumni and faculty from the University of Port Harcourt.

Alumni

Arts and entertainment
Andre Blaze - rapper, reality talent show host
Monalisa Chinda – actress
Diminas Dagogo – film director
Agbani Darego – model
Rita Dominic – actress
Linda Ejiofor – actress, model
Tamara Eteimo - actress, singer
Muma Gee – singer, actress
Bimbo Manuel – actor
Miraboi - businessman, singer
Clem Ohameze - actor
M Trill – rapper

Authors and journalists
Uchechukwu Peter Umezurike – author

Business and industry
Emmanuel Agwoje – banker, Chief Executive Officer of Equator Capital Ltd.
Alex Otti – former Group Managing Director of Diamond Bank
Tonye Princewill – Chairman of Riverdrill Group of Companies (Nigeria)

Management and marketing
 Miraboi — businessman and singer

Diplomacy, government, law and politics
Rotimi Amaechi – Governor of Rivers State
Innocent Barikor – Member of the Rivers State House of Assembly
Osinakachukwu Ideozu – Estate Surveyor; Senator
Godknows Igali - Diplomat, Federal Permanent Secretary and Technocrat
Goodluck Jonathan – President of Nigeria
Patience Jonathan – First Lady of Nigeria
Olaka Nwogu – Member of the House of Representatives
Silva Opuala-Charles – Commissioner of Finance and Budget
Emmanuel Paulker – Senator for the Bayelsa Central
Dakuku Peterside, politician
Timipre Sylva – Governor of Bayelsa State

Science
Franklin Erepamo Osaisai – nuclear engineer, energy scientist
Henry A. A. Ugboma – Professor of Maternal-fetal medicine and Chief Medical Director of the University of Port Harcourt Teaching Hospital, Rivers State.

Faculty

Current and former
 Claude Ake, political science & administration
 I. N. C. Aniebo – novelist and short story writer
 Ladipo Ayodeji Banjo – Emeritus professor of English language
 Innocent Barikor – senior lecturer in political science
 George C. Clerk, botany
 Silvia Federici, philosopher
 Robin W.G. Horton – English social anthropologist and philosopher
 Gerald Moore – scholar of contemporary African anglophone and francophone poetry
 Ogbonnaya Onu, chemical engineering
 Ola Rotimi, theatre arts
 Kay Williamson – linguist who specialised in the study of African languages

Vice Chancellors of the University of Port Harcourt
Joseph Atubokiki Ajienka
Nimi Briggs
Kelsey Harrison

See also
List of people from Rivers State

References

External links 
 University of Port Harcourt

University of Port Harcourt people
University of Port Harcourt people
University of Port Harcourt